Symphony No. 58 in F major, Hoboken I/58, is a symphony by Joseph Haydn, composed probably around 1767 but certainly not after 1774, after which time the traits of this symphony were outmoded. It is scored for two oboes, two horns and strings.

Movements
Allegro, 
Andante, 
Menuet alla zoppa - Trio. Un poco allegretto, 
Finale: Presto, 

The unique distinction alla zoppa on the Menuet literally means "limping" which Haydn accomplishes with a dotted rhythm pushed into all sorts of asymmetrical patterns.  This movement was also used in Haydn's Baryton Trio in D major (Hob 11/52).

A. Peter Brown has noted how the character of the first movement is very reminiscent of a minuet, and can be regarded as an "expanded Minuet".  Brown has also commented that the overall nature of the work highly resembles a suite where all four movements are dance-like in nature.

References

Symphony 058
Compositions in F major
1774 compositions